Kendall Ryan (born August 15, 1981) is a New York Times, Wall Street Journal and USA Today bestselling American novelist. She has written more than two dozen novels, including the self-published bestsellers Resisting Her, Hard to Love, The Impact of You, Hitched, Screwed, The Fix Up, Filthy Beautiful Lies and The Room Mate. Her books are described as "beautiful, electrifying love stories that can make even the most pessimistic person believe in happily ever afters." She writes romance, new adult and romantic comedies, and her books have sold more than 2 million copies worldwide. Her traditionally published books include the bestselling Love By Design series with Simon & Schuster.

Biography 
Ryan was born on August 15, 1981, in South Carolina. She has lived in South Carolina, Idaho, Guam, Michigan, California, Illinois, Minnesota and Texas. She graduated from Western Michigan University with a bachelor's degree in business, emphasis on Marketing.

Ryan signed with a literary agent in 2011 and was on submission to sell her first novel when she saw the rising success of indie authors on Amazon's new self-publishing platform, and decided to try self-publishing rather than accept a traditional publishing deal. In 2012 she left her job in corporate America to pursue writing full-time. Since that time, she has been featured on the New York Times and USA Today bestsellers lists more than three dozen times.

In 2015 Filthy Beautiful Lies was featured in Newsweek magazine as "The Next Fifty Shades" and her novel, The Gentleman Mentor was named as a GoodReads Best New Romance. Ryan's new series, When I Break was featured in Cosmopolitan Magazine.

Ryan has a passion for humanitarian work, particularity with disadvantaged children, and orphans. Adoption is a theme often explored in her books. In 2017, she signed on for a publishing contract with the Waterhouse Press, as well as Radish Fiction. She lives in Texas with her husband and two sons.

Selected works 
Unravel Me (2012)
Make Me Yours (2012)
Hard to Love (2013)
Resisting Her (2013)
The Impact of You (2013)
Working It (2013)
Filthy Beautiful Love (2014)
Reckless Love
The Room Mate (2017)
Dirty Little Secret (2017)
Baby Daddy (2018)

References 

1981 births
Living people
Western Michigan University alumni
Novelists from South Carolina
American women novelists
21st-century American women writers
American romantic fiction novelists
Women romantic fiction writers
21st-century American novelists